Zagreb Franjo Tuđman Airport or Zagreb Airport is an international airport serving Zagreb, Croatia. It is the largest and busiest airport in Croatia. In 2019 it handled 3.45 million passengers and some 13,000 tons of cargo.

It is the hub of the Croatian flag carrier Croatia Airlines and a focus city for Trade Air. The main base of the Croatian Air Force is also located at the airport's premises. Moreover, the Croatian Air Traffic Control has its administration situated on the grounds of the airport.

The airport was awarded to the ZAIC consortium (Zagreb Airport International Company) in a 30-year concession under the terms of a contract signed by the Government of Croatia with the aforementioned. The contract includes the financing, designing and construction of a new passenger terminal which was opened in March 2017. For the purpose of managing the airport ZAIC registered a company called MZLZ d.d. (Međunarodna zračna luka Zagreb d.d.) that is now the operator of the Airport.

History 

The history of Zagreb civil aviation began in 1909 when the first airfield was built close to the western city neighbourhood (city district) of Črnomerec.

With the creation of the first Yugoslav flag carrier Aeroput in 1927, the airport was relocated to the Borongaj airfield in 1928 which began serving the ever-growing number of passengers on 15 February of that year. Although several European airliners connected the city it was mostly Aeroput which connected Zagreb to major destinations across Europe and thus significantly increased traffic at Zagreb in the period preceding the Second World War.

Following World War II, commercial services were moved to a former military airbase near the village of Lučko south-west of the city in 1947. JAT Yugoslav Airlines took the role of Aeroput and made Zagreb its second hub. At its peak in 1959, Lučko served 167,000 passengers.

By 1966, Zagreb Airport got a new  state-of-the-art passenger terminal. The runway capacity was lengthened to its current  in 1974.

In the 1980s Zagreb Airport was the second largest in Yugoslavia by passenger and aircraft movements. Yugoslav flag-carrier JAT maintained a hub in Zagreb and connected the city to numerous destinations including New York City, Chicago, Toronto aboard its McDonnell Douglas DC-10 aircraft. These long haul services inevitably had a major impact on air traffic at Zagreb during that period.
 
On 31 August 1991, during the Croatian War of Independence, the airport became the scene of fighting between Croatian armed forces and the Yugoslav People's Army (JNA) when a Boeing 707 chartered by Anton Kikaš carrying weapons for the Croatians was forced to land there by Yugoslav MiGs. Croatian forces attacked the control tower and blocked roads in and out of the airport, but the JNA successfully seized the 707 and flew it out of the airport. The airport later became a UN hub for getting food and medical supplies to war-ridden Croatia and Bosnia. The British 24th Field Ambulance were stationed in a former JNA camp at the airport.

Following an increase in passenger numbers and the necessity to upgrade its infrastructure, the airport installed a CAT-IIIb instrument landing system (ILS) in 2004.

In 2008, a new VIP terminal was added and the terminal was extended to include extra amenities, restaurants and bars.

By 2010, the old terminal was nearing its maximum annual capacity. That year the passenger terminal received a major facelift in the course of which a viewing platform with a bar was added.

On 12 April 2012, the ZAIC consortium received a 30-year concession for the airport from the Government of Croatia. The consortium consists of Groupe ADP (21%), Bouygues Bâtiment International (21%), Marguerite Fund (21%), International Finance Corporation (17%), TAV Airports (15%) and Viadukt (5%). The concession includes financing, designing and constructing a new passenger terminal. The construction of a brand new  terminal facility designed by Neidhardt architects of Zagreb and carried out by Bouygues Bâtiment International in partnership with Viadukt began on 18 December 2013 with the aim to replace the old terminal. It now has an initial annual capacity of 5.5 million passengers in the first phase and was officially completed in October 2016. The official inauguration of the terminal was on 28 March 2017. ZAIC now operates the entire airport, including the runways, passenger terminal, cargo terminal, car parks and future property developments, under a 30-year concession. This contract involves a total investment of around €324 million: €236 million for the design and construction of the new terminal and €88 million for operation of all airport infrastructure for the entire period of the concession.

On 27 February 2020, the runway, formerly designated as 05/23, was redesignated to 04/22 due to the change in magnetic declination.

On 30 March 2021, Irish low-cost airline Ryanair announced the opening of a new base in Zagreb commencing July 2021. The airline will be basing three Airbus A320-200 aircraft and start flights to 26 previously unserved destinations.

Terminal 

The current terminal building was opened to the public on 28 March 2017. Furthermore, the new apron has three remote stands next to the terminal, while 23 stands at the old passenger building are also used during the peak season. Each of the aircraft parking positions at the facility includes a visual docking guidance system which gives information to a pilot on how to park their aircraft. The terminal itself features a large 600 square metre duty-free shop operated by Aelia, 16 cafés, bars, restaurants and snack bars as well as 12 retail stores.

Enough space has been left for 30 additional check-in counters and 2 baggage carousels to be added once the new terminal reaches its current maximum capacity of 5 million passengers. Further extensions envisaged along the thirty-year concession period will potentially see expanding current apron from present  and terminal capacity increased to 8 million through gradual expansion of the terminal in four Phase 2 expansions.

Airlines and destinations

Passenger

Cargo

Ground transportation
ZAG can be reached from the city centre by scheduled local bus services (No. 290) operated by ZET or scheduled coach services operated by Croatia Airlines' subsidiary Pleso Prijevoz.

Statistics

Traffic

Acknowledgements
 2022 Airport Service Quality (ASQ) Award in 3 categories:
  Best Airport of 2 to 5 million Passengers in Europe
 Airport with the Most Dedicated Staff in Europe
 Easiest Airport Journey in Europe

References

External links 

 Official website of operator
 
 

Airports in Croatia
1962 establishments in Croatia
Airports established in 1962
Airport
Buildings and structures in Zagreb County
Airport
Velika Gorica